RNI may refer to:

Radio
Radio Newyork International, a 1980s pirate radio station which broadcast from a ship anchored just off New York city
Radio Norway International, a former division of the Norwegian Broadcasting Corporation
Radio Noordzee, 1960s Dutch-language broadcaster from the artificial REM Island
Radio Noordzee Internationaal or Radio North Sea International, 1970s Dutch-language and English-language broadcaster from the radio ship Mebo II
Radio Nova (disambiguation), name of numerous radio stations
Radio Nova International, name of numerous radio stations

Other uses
A now discontinued alternative of Java Native Interface (a Java programming framework), one offered by Microsoft
Corn Island Airport (IATA Code: RNI) on Corn Island, Nicaragua
Rajawali Nasional Indonesia, an Indonesian company
Rate of natural increase, a demographic measurement
National Rally of Independents, a political party in Morocco
"Reference Nutrient Intake", statistical measure of nutrient deficiency in the UK population
The Office of the Registrar of Newspapers for India
Rob Navarro Invitational, an annual golf tournament in South Carolina
"Rolf Nevanlinna Institute" of the University of Helsinki
Relative Nest Intensity, a measure of how efficiently a CPU and its cache memory are being used, in IBM terminology

See also
R&I (disambiguation)